The 1966 Giro di Lombardia cycling race took place on 22 October 1966, and was won by Salvarani's Felice Gimondi. It was the 60th edition of the Giro di Lombardia "monument" classic race.

Results

References

 

Giro di Lombardia
Giro di Lombardia, 1966
Giro di Lombardia
1966 Super Prestige Pernod